This is a list of triathletes who are athletes notable for their achievements in the triathlon.

Legend

Men

Women

References

Triathlon
Triathletes